Harold Joseph Urquijo Vanstrahlengs (born 16 May 1988) is a skillful Colombian footballer. He plays as a forward currently playing for Academia FC.

Club career
Harold moved to Columbus GA, USA at the beginning of 2006. At the age of 17 years, he became a professional player in Colombia's second division playing for the Academia FC from Santa fe de Bogota, Colombia main City.

Harold was 3 times national champion league amateur in category U-15, U-16 and U-17. Years 2003, 2004 and 2005. He scored more than 55 goals in 3 years.

International career
In 2004, he was selected for the Colombia National U-17 Team. He is now a Colombia U20 international.

External links
Profile at BDFA

1988 births
Living people
Sportspeople from Barranquilla
Colombian footballers
Academia F.C. players
Crystal Palace Baltimore players
Colombian expatriate footballers
Expatriate soccer players in the United States
USL Second Division players
Association football forwards